The East Wetumpka Commercial Historic District, in Wetumpka, Alabama, is a historic district which was listed on the National Register of Historic Places in 1992.

The district includes most of the central business district of Wetumpka. Roughly, it consists of Company St. from Spring St. to E. Bridge St. and E. Bridge and Commerce Sts. from Main to Hill Streets, in Wetumpka.

Among the most important buildings are:

Bank of Wetumpka building (c.1910), 110 East Bridge St, a two-story white masonry bank building, with bold vertical-oriented architectural design, one of only two architect-designed buildings in the district, at prominent five-way intersection.

First National Bank (c.1910), Company Street, a two-story bank building, triangular (flatiron) in shape, with landmark clock, at same five-way intersection.  Pilasters support a wide architrave above the first floor windows, and pattern is repeated, smaller, at second story.
Lancaster Hotel building (c.1903), 102 Court St. and East Main St., at same five-way intersection; a three-story hotel

Elmore County Courthouse (1931), Commerce Street. This is a monumental two-story Classical Revival building "with Egyptian Art Deco overtones", the other architect-designed building in the district. It has a central loggia supported by eight massive, fluted columns, and an architrave decorated with modillions and flowerettes.
221 Company Street (c.1910), a three-story brick commercial building regarded as a historical social and economic hub of the black community of Wetumpka; it has also been known as the Rose-Geeter Funeral Home.
Old Jail (c.1820), one-story brick building with small barred windows on three sides, regarded as Wetumpka's first jail.

References

External links

National Register of Historic Places in Elmore County, Alabama
Historic districts on the National Register of Historic Places in Alabama
Georgian architecture in Alabama